MacArthur is a 1999 two-part television documentary film about Douglas MacArthur, a United States General of the Army. Produced by PBS for The American Experience (now simply American Experience) documentary program, it recounts the significant events and controversies in MacArthur's life, from childhood to his death in 1964. Written and produced by Austin Hoyt, directed by Hoyt and Sarah Holt, and narrated by David Ogden Stiers, the film first aired on PBS in two parts on May 17 and 18, 1999.

Interviewees

Stephen E. Ambrose, historian
Zeneida Quezon Avenceña, daughter of Manuel L. Quezon
Leon Beck, U.S. Army
Faubion Bowers, aide to MacArthur
Tanya Brooks, daughter-in-law
Alfred X. Burgos, Manila resident
Charles Canada Jr., friend of Arthur MacArthur Jr.
Robert Dallek, historian
John Dower, historian
Daniel Finn, U.S. Army
Carol Gluck, historian
Beate Sirota-Gordon, constitution drafter for Japan
Richard M. Gordon, U.S. Army
Joseph C. Harsch, journalist
Stanley Karnow, author
Hal Lamar, aide to Admiral Chester Nimitz
Robert W. Love, Ernest J. King biographer
Harry J. Maihafer, military historian
Merrill Pasco, aide to George Marshall
Geoffrey Perret, biographer
Carol Petillo, biographer
Edwin Ramsey, U.S. Army guerilla
Beth Day Romulo, Manila journalist
Frank J. Sackton, aide to MacArthur
Michael Schaller, historian
Donald Showers, aide to Admiral Nimitz
Edwin H. Simmons, marine historian
Mark Stoler, George Marshall biographer
Stephen Taaffe, historian
Frank Tremaine, journalist
Vernon A. Walters, U.S. Army
Yoshida Yutaka, historian
Kenneth R. Young, Arthur MacArthur Jr. biographer

Critical response
Walter Goodman of The New York Times gave MacArthur a positive review, stating that "Although far from uncritical, Austin Hoyt's carefully balanced approach does justice to MacArthur's tactical abilities even as it takes account of a political obtuseness that at times verged on megalomania." Shannon Jones of World Socialist Web Site also gave an overall positive review, although with reservations, stating that "To the producers' credit the program attempts to deal with the subject in a serious way. [...] However, as one expects with American television, the commentary, while often informative, does not probe too deeply the political issues raised by Douglas MacArthur's career, nor does the production seriously challenge the image of the general as a 'hero'".

Home media
MacArthur was first released on VHS by PBS on May 11, 1999, a few days before its television broadcast. PBS would later release the film on DVD by February 10, 2004.

References

External links
Official PBS site

1999 television films
1999 films
1999 documentary films
American Experience
American documentary television films
Biographical films about military leaders
1990s English-language films